Shrink is a 2009 American independent black comedy-drama film about a psychiatrist who treats members of the entertainment industry in Los Angeles, California. It was directed by Jonas Pate, written by Thomas Moffett, and stars Kevin Spacey and along with an ensemble cast. The film premiered at the 2009 Sundance Film Festival and includes music by Jackson Browne.

Plot
In Hollywood, Psychiatrist Dr. Henry Carter (Kevin Spacey): most of Carter's patients are luminaries in the film industry, each undergoing their own life crisis. Carter lives in a large, luxurious house overlooking the Hollywood Hills and has published a hugely successful self-help book. However, he is disheveled and lives alone in his large house. He smokes marijuana at home, in his car and behind his office, when not seeing patients. Carter routinely drinks himself to sleep around his house, waking up in his clothes and never enters his bedroom. Despite his own problems, Carter continues psychotherapy with his patients, maintaining his incisiveness, compassion and strong doctor-patient relationships.

Around some of Carter's patients, Patrick (Dallas Roberts) is a high-powered talent agent who is both narcissistic and anxiety- ridden, with a germ phobia, Seamus (Jack Huston) is an actor addicted to various drugs and alcohol, and one of Patrick's biggest clients, Seamus is not one of Carter's patients, but they share a drug-dealer named Jesus (Jesse Plemons). Jack Holden (Robin Williams) is another popular celebrity with a drinking problem, about which he is in denial. He continues therapy, however, because he believes that he has a sex addiction. Kate (Saffron Burrows) is an actress in her thirties, who is intelligent, compassionate and poised, but is facing fewer career opportunities because of Patrick's notion that her age is a limitation. Her rock-star husband, who she says "wasn't always like this," is self-centered and cheating on her. Carter's newest patient, Jemma (Keke Palmer) is a troubled high-school student, who is required to see a therapist by her school, after cutting her hand by punching a mirror. She is referred to Carter by his father as a pro bono case because like Carter's wife, Jemma's mother died by suicide. Jemma is an avid moviegoer who aspires to become a filmmaker.

Carter has few friends, and spends time with Jesus, his quirky pot dealer. Carter also socializes with Jeremy (Mark Webber) to whom he is loosely related through Carter's deceased wife, whose mother was Jeremy's godmother. Jeremy is a struggling young screenwriter who finds romantic interest in Patrick's assistant Daisy (Pell James). Jeremy also derives creative inspiration from Jemma. Jeremy secretly steals Jemma's private file from Carter's office and pursues a platonic interest in Jemma. He writes his breakthrough screenplay about Jemma, and with Daisy's help, Jeremy succeeds in gaining Patrick's interest in the screenplay.

Carter suffers a breakdown on a live television talk show, alarming the host (Gore Vidal) and the viewers when he states publicly for the first time that his wife died by suicide. He denounces his book as "bullshit" and himself as a fraud, and storms off of the set. Jemma, Daisy and Jeremy react to Carter's on-air outburst. Carter decides to stop treating Jemma, though he begins helping Jemma finally come to terms with her mother's suicide.

Jemma discovers the screenplay and feels betrayed by Jeremy. Carter angrily attacks Jeremy for his deception, but accepts his own professional responsibility in the situation, which he unknowingly allowed. Later, Carter and Jeremy are mysteriously invited to a meeting at Patrick's office. Patrick seats them in a conference room, where Jemma is already waiting. To their surprise, Jemma now approves of Jeremy's screenplay. Patrick announces that he will be representing Jemma and making Jeremy's screenplay into a movie. Carter, having disposed of his drug supply, approaches Kate at home. He tells her he doesn't want to see her anymore "...professionally," implying his interest in seeing her romantically. She smiles.

That night, Carter enters his bedroom, wearing pajamas. He momentarily regards his former marital bed, before climbing into it and turning off the light.

Cast
 Kevin Spacey as Dr. Henry Carter
 Saffron Burrows as Kate Amberson
 Keke Palmer as Jemma
 Mark Webber as Jeremy
 Jack Huston as Shamus
 Robert Loggia as Dr. Robert Carter, Henry's father
 Pell James as Daisy
 Jesse Plemons as Jesus, Carter's pot dealer
 Sierra Aylina McClain as Carina
 Dallas Roberts as Patrick
 Ashley Greene as Missy
 Laura Ramsey as Kiera
 Gore Vidal as George Charles
 Jillian Armenante as writer in Patrick's writer's room
 Robin Williams as Jack Holden (uncredited)

References

External links
 
 Shrink at Rotten Tomatoes
 Shrink at Allmovie
 Shrink at Metacritic

2009 films
2009 comedy-drama films
American independent films
American comedy-drama films
Films set in Los Angeles
Films about psychiatry
American films about cannabis
Roadside Attractions films
2009 comedy films
2009 drama films
2009 independent films
2000s English-language films
Films directed by Jonas Pate
2000s American films